The Gronant Formation is a geologic formation in Wales. It preserves fossils dating back to the Carboniferous period.

See also

 List of fossiliferous stratigraphic units in Wales

References
 

Carboniferous System of Europe
Carboniferous Wales